Sunayna Raiza Wahi (born 14 August 1990) is a Surinamese female sprinter, born in Paramaribo.

She competed at the 2016 Summer Olympics in Rio de Janeiro, in the women's 100 metres.

References

External links

1990 births
Living people
Surinamese female sprinters
Olympic athletes of Suriname
Athletes (track and field) at the 2016 Summer Olympics
Pan American Games competitors for Suriname
Athletes (track and field) at the 2015 Pan American Games
Athletes (track and field) at the 2018 South American Games
World Athletics Championships athletes for Suriname
Competitors at the 2018 Central American and Caribbean Games
Olympic female sprinters